"I'd Fly" is a song recorded in 1994 by French-Italian singer Richard Cocciante with Francesca Belenis set to the music of Cocciante's French song "Pour Elle" written by Cocciante and Jean-Paul Dréau released by Richard Cocciante in 1993. Its English lyrics were written by Roxanne Seeman and are unrelated to the original French-language song.

I'd Fly was released on Cocciante's album Un Uomo Felice released by Sony Italy, 1994. The album features duets with Italian singers, most notably the extraordinary voice of Mina, singing songs covering themes of love.

With the exception of "I'd Fly", all the songs on "Un Uomo Felice" are in Italian. Un Uomo Felice charted Top Ten sales in Europe. In 1995, songs from Un Uomo Felice including "I'd Fly" charted on Music & Media Charts Airplay, Major Market airplay for the most aired songs for Europe’s leading radio markets.

Pour Elle 
Pour Elle is the original French song by Richard Cocciante written by Cocciante and Dreau. In 1993, Pour Elle appeared on Cocciante's albums Empreinte, Eventi e mutamenti, and Inventos y Experimentos. It is the second track from Empreinte album and was issued as a single and charted in France.

The song was recorded by  Cocciante in French as" Pour Elle", Italian as "Per Lei" and Spanish as "Por Ella" and charted in several territories. Pour Elle entered the French chart on February 10, 1993 and reached number 45.

The song is the title track of Cocciante’s album “Per Lei” released Brazil.

Empreinte album 
Empreinte is an album in the French language by Richard Cocciante that charted in France and was considered Franco-Italian. It was released by the Sony Music Tristar label in 1993.  The lyrics for the songs on the album were written by notable auteurs Jean-Loup Dabadie, Jean-Paul Dréau and Luc Plamondon. 

Pour Elle was a chart single in France. The English version "I'd Fly" by Cocciante feat. Belenis was released on the album "Un Uomo Felice" by Virgin in Italy in 1994. The Spanish version "Por Ella" by Cocciante was released on the album "Un Hombre Feliz by CBS/Sony in Spain in 1995. The Italian version "Per Lei" was the title track of a Brazilian album by Cocciante's released by Globo Polydor in 1995.

Critical reception 
Music & Media praised Empreinte writing "...Cocciante has developed a career on both sides of the Alps. His powerful voice has not weakened and the set of songs…are vintage Cocciante...Already charted in France, this Franco-Italian effort should cross borders."

Personnel
 Composer, Producer, Arranger, Vocals – Richard Cocciante
 Arranger, Keyboards, Piano, Programming – Leonardo de Amicis
 Bass – Francesco Puglisi
 Drums – Maurizio Dei Lazzaretti
 Guitar – Paolo Carta
 Recorded By – Fabio Patrignani, Fabio Venturi

Paul De Leeuw version 

A Dutch version, Voorbij was released by Paul de Leeuw with lyrics written by de Leeuw. The Dutch lyrics are unrelated to the original French-language lyrics. Voorbij reached No. 2 on the Dutch Top 40 and National Hit parade Top 50 and remained on the Dutch charts for 12 weeks. Voorbij was often heard at funerals.

Diane Schuur versions 

"I'd Fly" was recorded in 1999 by Diane Schuur on Atlantic Records produced by Ahmet Ertegun, Shane Keister, and Yves Beauvais during the recording sessions for "Music Is My Life". It was decided that I'd Fly, an original French song, would not fit into an album of songs from the American Songbook, so it was not included in the album release. When Diane Schuur was making her next album for Concord Records, she played "I'd Fly" for Phil Ramone. With Ahmet Ertegun's approval, Schuur released "I'd Fly" on her "Friends For Schuur" album.

July 15, 2021, Rhino Atlantic digitally released Diane Schuur's recording of "I'd Fly" produced by Ahmet Ertegun and Shane Keister.

Phil Ramone production

Personnel and production 
The tracking session took place at Ocean Way Recording in Hollywood with Phil Ramone producing. Richard Cocciante recorded his guest vocal for "I'd Fly" in London.

 Diane Schuur – vocals
 Richard Cocciante – vocals
 Alan Broadbent – Piano, arranger 
 James Hughart – bass (acoustic)
 Gregg Field – drums
 Michael Thompson – guitar
 Randy Waldman - synthesizer
 Paulinho da Costa - percussion
 Phil Ramone – producer

Critical reception

Paula Edelstein of Allmusic wrote "I'd Fly" is a definite smooth jazz hit. She sings its sexy, but beautifully contoured melody, romantic lyrics with such yearning and passion that this late-night romantic ballad should land solidly on the charts.

Ahmet Ertegun with Shane Keister production

Personnel 
 Diane Schuur – vocals
 Alan Broadbent – Piano, arranger
 John Patitucci– bass
 Gregg Field – drums
 Dean Parks – guitar
 Emil Richards - percussion
 Ahmet Ertegun – producer
 Shane Keister – producer

Other versions 
In the mid-1990s, Patricia Kaas recorded a version of "I'd Fly" during recording sessions produced by Joel Dorn and his son Adam Dorn for an album that was ultimately not released.

References

Richard Cocciante songs
Diane Schuur songs
Songs written by Roxanne Seeman
1993 songs
1994 songs
2000 songs
French-language songs
Italian-language songs
Spanish-language songs
Dutch-language songs
Songs written by Riccardo Cocciante
English-language French songs
Song recordings produced by Phil Ramone
Song recordings produced by Ahmet Ertegun
Songs about heartache